Serafín Fabricio García (born July 15, 1975 in Montevideo, Uruguay) is a Uruguayan footballer currently playing for Boston River of the Segunda División in Uruguay. He played as a right midfielder.

Teams
  Peñarol 1996-1999
  Chacarita Juniors 1999-2000
  Peñarol 2000-2001
  Lanús 2002-2003
  Gimnasia y Esgrima de La Plata 2003
  Cerro Porteño 2004
  Montevideo Wanderers 2005
  Peñarol 2006-2007
  Villa Española 2008
  Durazno 2009
  El Tanque Sisley 2009-2010
  Boston River 2010–present

References
 Profile at BDFA 

1975 births
Living people
Uruguayan footballers
Uruguayan expatriate footballers
Uruguay international footballers
Montevideo Wanderers F.C. players
El Tanque Sisley players
Villa Española players
Peñarol players
Club Almagro players
Club Atlético Lanús footballers
Cerro Porteño players
Chacarita Juniors footballers
Club de Gimnasia y Esgrima La Plata footballers
Boston River players
Expatriate footballers in Argentina
Expatriate footballers in Paraguay

Association football defenders